Stephen Frederick Starr (born March 24, 1940) is an American expert on Russian and Eurasian affairs, a musician, and a former president of Oberlin College.

Founder and chairman of the Central Asia-Caucasus Institute, he is fluent in Russian and is the author or editor of 20 books and more than 200 articles on Russian and Eurasian affairs. Starr's expertise is in Afghanistan, Central Asia, the Caucasus, Russia, and the rest of the former Soviet Union. He focuses on developing nations, energy and environment issues, Islamic faith, culture and law, and oil politics.

Starr has advised three U.S. presidents on Russian/Eurasian affairs and chaired an external advisory panel on U.S. government-sponsored research on the region, organized and co-authored the first comprehensive strategic assessment of Central Asia, the Caucasus, and Afghanistan for the Joint Chiefs of Staff in 1999. He joined the American Foreign Policy Council as a Distinguished Fellow for Eurasia in January 2017.

Early life 
He was born on March 24, 1940. 
Among North American archaeologists, he is known for his survey of archaeological sites throughout Hamilton County, Ohio. In 1958, the results of his exploration of a prehistoric Native American mound were published by The Historical and Philosophical Society of Ohio, and the results of his countywide survey were published by the Cincinnati Museum of Natural History in 1960.
Starr earned a bachelor of arts degree at Yale University in 1962. While there, he was a member of the social and literary fraternity St. Anthony Hall.

He then received his M.A. at the King's College, University of Cambridge. He received a Ph.D. in history at Princeton University.

Career

Academics
He began work as an archaeologist in Turkey and in 1974 started the Kennan Institute for Advanced Russian Studies, which opened U.S. research contact with Central Asia. He served as vice president of Tulane University from 1979–1982, as well as its vice provost from 1980–1981.

Starr served as the 12th president of Oberlin College from 1983 to 1994. Despite increasing minority hiring, Starr's presidency contained clashes with students over such issues as divestment from South Africa and the dismissal of a campus minister, as well as his desire to turn Oberlin into "Harvard of the Midwest." After a clash with students on the front lawn of his home in April 1990, Starr took a leave of absence as president from July 1991–February 1992. He resigned in March 1993, effective to June of that year. After leaving Oberlin, he was president of the Aspen Institute from 1994–1996.

Journalist Ken Silverstein has dubbed Starr "The Professor of Repression" due to his support for corrupt despotic regimes in the Caspian region. Similarly, a book on the 2008 Georgian-Russian war co-edited by Starr was criticized for lack of impartiality.

Musician
Starr is a jazz clarinetist. In 1980, he co-founded the Louisiana Repertory Jazz Ensemble while at Tulane. The ensemble is  dedicated "to preserving the raucous pre-1930 jazz of New Orleans." The band has performed across the United States, France, and the former Soviet Union. In March 1982, the group gave the Doubleday Lecture at the Smithsonian Institution. It also made national television appearances in Italy, Japan and Sweden. Jazz historian Al Rose once called it "the most authentic band on the scene today". The Ensemble's albums include Alive and Well (1981), Uptown Jazz (1984) and Hot & Sweet: Sounds of Lost New Orleans (1986).

Publications

Books 
 Decentralization and Self-Government in Russia, 1830-1870. Princeton University Press, 1972. 
 Melnikov. Solo Architect in a Mass Society. Princeton University Press, 1978. 
 Two Evils: Memoirs of a Diplomat-Soldier During the Third Reich. with Hans von Herwarth. Collins, 1981. 
 Red and Hot. The Fate of Jazz in the Soviet Union 1917-1980. Oxford University Press, 1983 .
 Southern Comfort: The Garden District of New Orleans, 1800-1900. MIT Press, 1989.  
 Bamboula!: The Life and Times of Louis Moreau Gottschalk. Oxford University Press, 1995. 
 Strategic Assessment of Central Eurasia. Atlantic Council of the United States, 2001. with Charles Fairbanks, C. Richard Nelson, and Kenneth Weisbrode.
 Lost Enlightenment: Central Asia's Golden Age from the Arab Conquest to Tamerlane. Princeton University Press, 2013. 
 Looking Forward: Kazakhstan and the United States. with Bulat Sultanov, S. Enders Wimbush, Fatima Kukeyeva, Svante E. Cornell, and Askar Nursha. Central Asia-Caucasus Institute & Silk Road Studies Program, 2014.

Articles 
 "A Usable Past" in Alexander Dallin and Gail S. Lapidus, eds. The Soviet System: From Crisis to Collapse, 2nd. revised edition. Westview Press, 1995, pp 11–15.  
 "Rediscovering Central Asia." The Wilson Quarterly. Summer 2009.

Edited 
 Legacy of History in Russia and the New States of Eurasia. M.E. Sharpe, 1994. 
 Xinjiang: China 's Muslim Borderland. Routledge, 2004. .
 The Guns of August 2008: Russia's War in Georgia, with Svante E. Cornell, editor. M.E. Sharpe, 2009. 
 Putin’s Grand Strategy: The Eurasian Union and Its Discontents, with Svante E. Cornell. Central Asia-Caucasus Institute & Silk Road Studies Program, 2014.

References

External links

1940 births
Living people
Yale University alumni
St. Anthony Hall
Princeton University alumni
Cambridge College alumni
International relations scholars
American jazz clarinetists
Tulane University faculty
Johns Hopkins University faculty
Terrorism in Central Asia
Presidents of Oberlin College
21st-century clarinetists
20th-century non-fiction writers